Zamia prasina is a species of plant in the family Zamiaceae. It is native to Yucatán, Campeche, Quintana Roo, Tabasco and Chiapas in Mexico and Guatemala and Belize. Its natural habitat is subtropical or tropical moist montane forests. It is threatened by habitat loss.

References

Flora of Belize
prasina
Critically endangered plants
Endemic flora of Belize
Taxonomy articles created by Polbot